The Redbury New York (formerly, the Women's Hotel, Martha Washington Hotel, Hotel Thirty Thirty, Hotel Lola, and King & Grove New York) is a historic hotel at 29 East 29th Street, between Madison Avenue and Park Avenue South in the NoMad neighborhood of Manhattan, New York City.  It was built from 1901 to 1903, and was designed by Robert W. Gibson in the Renaissance Revival style for the Women's Hotel Company. It was originally a women's-only hotel.

History 

The hotel was designed by architect Robert W. Gibson, and opened on March 2, 1903, as the first hotel in the city exclusively for women, serving both transient guests and permanent residents. It originally had 416 rooms and was almost immediately fully occupied, with over 200 names on a waiting list. 

On June 19, 2012, it was designated a historical landmark by the New York City Landmarks Preservation Commission. The original name of the hotel was the "Women's Hotel", and subsequent names (after "Martha Washington Hotel") include "Hotel Thirty Thirty" (2003), "Hotel Lola" (2011) and "King & Grove New York" (2012).

On May 21, 2014, King & Grove Hotels announced it was re-branding all of their hotels under the name "Chelsea Hotels", and that King & Grove New York would be re-launched as the "Martha Washington Hotel" in August 2014.  As part of the project, the lobby level of the hotel was completely redesigned in a modern fashion, and includes a new restaurant, "Marta", run by Danny Meyer's Union Square Hospitality Group.  The restored hotel has over 6,000 square feet of function space.

The hotel was sold to CIM in 2015 for $158 million. They renamed the hotel "The Redbury New York Hotel" in early 2016. It was also inducted into Historic Hotels of America, the official program of the National Trust for Historic Preservation, that same year.

Notable residents 
Poet Sara Teasdale stayed at the hotel during her New York visits from early 1913 onwards. Even after her marriage to Ernst Filsinger in December 1914, Teasdale often chose to stay at the Hotel. Actress Louise Brooks lived there after being evicted from the Algonquin Hotel, and editor Louise E. Dew was a resident as well.

The hotel has a connection with actress Veronica Lake. One of Hollywood's most bankable actresses of the 1940s, Lake was by 1952 unable to continue working as an actress because of her difficult reputation; Raymond Chandler referred to her as "Moronica Lake." After divorcing her husband, she drifted between cheap hotels in Brooklyn and New York City and was arrested several times for public drunkenness and disorderly conduct. A reporter found her working as a barmaid at the all-women's Martha Washington Hotel in Manhattan. At first, Lake claimed that she was a guest at the hotel and covering for a friend. Soon afterward, she admitted that she was employed at the bar. The reporter's widely distributed story led to some television and stage appearances.

The hotel served as the headquarters of the Interurban Women's Suffrage Council from 1907.

In popular culture 
The hotel is featured in the movie Valley of the Dolls; Anne Welles stayed there after arriving in New York for the first time.
The first-floor ballroom on the 29th Street side of the hotel, at 29 East 29th Street, was the third location of the Danceteria nightclub, from 1989 to 1992.
 The protagonist of Jean Webster's novel Daddy-Long-Legs stays at the Martha Washington while on a visit to New York.

See also 
 List of New York City Landmarks

References

External links 

Picture of an old advertising sign for the hotel

Hotels established in 1903
Hotel buildings completed in 1903
Hotels in Manhattan
New York City Designated Landmarks in Manhattan
Rose Hill, Manhattan
1903 establishments in New York City
Manger hotels
Historic Hotels of America